Non Narai is a district (amphoe) of Surin province, northeastern Thailand.

History
The minor district (king amphoe) was established on 1 July 1997, when five tambons were split from Rattanaburi district.

On 15 May 2007, all 81 minor districts were upgraded to full districts. On 24 August the upgrade became official.

Geography
Neighboring districts are (from the south clockwise): Samrong Thap, Sanom and Rattanaburi of Surin Province, and Mueang Chan of Sisaket province.

Administration
The district is divided into five sub-districts (tambons), which are further subdivided into 67 villages (mubans). There are no municipal (thesaban) areas, and further five tambon administrative organizations (TAO).

References

External links
amphoe.com

Non Narai